All Arunachal Pradesh Students' Union is the apex students' union body in Arunachal Pradesh, India. It executes, regulates and maintains all the student body organizations of the state. In the absence of a strong opposition party in the state, it sometimes acts as the opposition for the ruling government.

Election
Its elections are held on different locations i.e, usually District wise in the state after each session. Elections tenure are of three years term.

References

Students' unions in India
Education in Arunachal Pradesh
Organisations based in Arunachal Pradesh
Year of establishment missing